Mona Singh is a Professor of Computer Science in the Lewis-Sigler Institute for Integrative Genomics at Princeton University.

Education
Singh was educated at Indian Springs School, Harvard University and Massachusetts Institute of Technology where she was awarded a PhD in 1996 for research supervised by Ron Rivest and Bonnie Berger.

Career and research
Singh's research interests are in computational biology, genomics, bioinformatics and their interfaces with machine learning and algorithms.

Awards and honors
Singh was awarded a Presidential Early Career Award for Scientists and Engineers (PECASE) from the National Science Foundation (NSF) in 2001. She was elected a Fellow of the International Society for Computational Biology (ISCB) in 2018 for “outstanding contributions to the fields of computational biology and bioinformatics”.
She was elected an ACM Fellow in 2019 “for contributions to computational biology, spearheading algorithmic and machine learning approaches for characterizing proteins and their interactions”.

References

Living people
American bioinformaticians
Massachusetts Institute of Technology alumni
Indian Springs School alumni
Harvard University alumni
Fellows of the Association for Computing Machinery
Fellows of the International Society for Computational Biology
Year of birth missing (living people)